The State Register of Heritage Places is maintained by the Heritage Council of Western Australia. As of 2021, 425 places are heritage-listed in the City of Albany, of which 94 are on the State Register of Heritage Places.

List
As of 2021, following places are heritage listed in the City of Albany but are not State registered:

 † Denotes building has been demolished

References

Heritage places in Albany, Western Australia
Albany